The Supermobile is the fictional vehicle for the DC Comics superhero Superman. It is capable of duplicating all of his abilities in situations where he finds himself powerless. It was introduced in a story entitled "It's a Bird... It's a Plane... It's Supermobile!", published in Action Comics # 481, cover dated March 1978.

Writer Cary Bates says that the Supermobile was created as a promotional tie-in for the Corgi Toys toy line: "In my opinion, whenever merchandising needs are dictating story content, the odds of any real creativity or inspiration are severely compromised".

Background
When waves of red solar radiation from a long-exploded star reach Earth, the android Amazo reactivates and escapes his captivity on the satellite headquarters of the Justice League of America, seeking out his creator, Professor Ivo in the hopes of being returned to his deactivated state. With the rest of the Justice League imprisoned in another dimension by Amazo, though he makes sure they are able to watch him, which they do, only Superman stands ready to defend Ivo, though he is left powerless by the red solar radiation, as he derives his power from Earth's yellow sun.

Luring Amazo to his Fortress of Solitude in the Arctic, after teleporting himself and Ivo there and hiding Ivo, Superman unleashes his new secret weapon on the android: a small vehicle he has dubbed the Supermobile, which is capable of duplicating all of his powers, including invulnerability, as it is constructed of Supermanium, a metal so strong that "only Superman's heat vision can soften the substance, and only his super-strength is mighty enough to mold it!" He finally travels five days into the future, when the radiation has passed Earth, enabling him to regain his powers.

Although it does reappear a few months later in a battle with the Atomic Skull and Titano, Superman rarely uses the Supermobile again. The vehicle has made a few unofficial cameo appearances in recent years, however. A few different versions of the Supermobile are seen protecting a futuristic Ivy Town in All-New Atom #8. The classic design of the vehicle can also be seen atop the sign of Funky Flashman's used automobile dealership (which also contains a lot full of Batmobiles from various media) in the fifth chapter of the Doctor Thirteen serial "Architecture and Morality" in Tales of the Unexpected #5.

Abilities
The Supermobile does not just duplicate Superman's powers, it acts as a conduit for the Man of Steel's powers, allowing him to channel them through the vehicle itself. The Supermanium hull of the SMB shields Superman from red solar radiation that would rob him of his powers, making it so that he remains at the height of his abilities as long as he is within the vehicle. When Amazo remarks that no engine on Earth could react as quickly and easily as the Supermobile's, Superman responds, "You're right about that, Amazo! But who said anything about an engine?", revealing that the vehicle is powered completely by Superman himself.

Besides invulnerability and flight, the Supermobile also channels Superman's other powers using the following devices:
 Large mechanical arms mounted on either side of the cockpit area, allowing Superman to both punch and grasp.
 A scope on the control panel which can be adjusted to work with each of Superman's vision-related powers: normal, telescopic, microscopic, x-ray, heat, and night vision.
 Air jets that pop out from various points around the vehicle, allowing Superman to use his super breath if he blows into a face mask attached to the control panel.
 A monitor and other communications and listening devices substitute for his super hearing.

In other media

Cartoons
 The Supermobile appeared in at least four episodes of Super Friends: "Terror from the Phantom Zone" and "Journey Through Inner Space" (both from the 1978 season), "Lex Luthor Strikes Back" (from the 1979-1980 season, The World's Greatest Super Friends), and "The Krypton Syndrome" (from the so-called "lost episodes" of 1983).
 In the episode "Battle of the Super-Heroes!" of Batman: The Brave and the Bold, Lex Luthor uses what looks like a version of the Supermobile, albeit in his standard colors of purple and green, to challenge Superman, but was quickly destroyed.

Toys
 Corgi Toys made die-cast models of the Supermobile in two different sizes, the "Junior" model (3 inches in length, about the size of a Matchbox or Hot Wheels car) and a larger, 1/36 scale version.
 Kenner produced a Supermobile to go with their Super Powers Collection, one that was big enough to fit the line's action figures. The design differed a bit from the original, however; the two mechanical arms were absent, replaced by a front-mounted "Krypton Action Ram".
 In 2022, McFarlane Toys produced a Supermobile scaled for 5-inch action figures as part of the first wave of its revival of the Super Powers Collection toyline. This version resembles the original Corgi / comic book design, with fists controlled by a dial on the bottom of the toy, a canopy opened by pressing the Superman "S" shield on the front, and two "jail cell compartments" in the wings.

References

External links
DC Comics Database - Supermobile
DCU Guide - Supermobile

Superman
1978 comics debuts